Erika Kovacs (born 18 May 1973) is a Romanian bobsledder. She competed in the two woman event at the 2002 Winter Olympics.

References

External links
 

1973 births
Living people
Romanian female bobsledders
Olympic bobsledders of Romania
Bobsledders at the 2002 Winter Olympics
Sportspeople from Miercurea Ciuc